The Texas Grand Prix, known as the EchoPark Grand Prix, for sponsorship reasons, is a NASCAR Cup Series stock car race at Circuit of the Americas in Austin, Texas. Introduced in 2021, the race was one of seven road course dates on the Cup Series schedule that year.

The race is supported by the NASCAR Xfinity Series' Pit Boss 250 and the NASCAR Craftsman Truck Series' XPEL 225.

History
Circuit of the Americas, a  road course in Austin, opened in 2012 with major events being Formula One's United States Grand Prix and MotoGP's Motorcycle Grand Prix of the Americas. For its prestige, the track was subject to calls from fans to be added to the NASCAR calendar, but a primary obstacle was the need for other speedways to give up their races which were protected by sanctioning contracts. Texas Motor Speedway, an oval track located three hours away in Fort Worth that regularly hosted two Cup Series races, was a large opponent as it maintained an agreement with NASCAR that prevented the sanctioning body from adding races in the region. TMS president Eddie Gossage also clashed with COTA and F1 in 2014 and 2018 when the latter scheduled the USGP for the same weekend as NASCAR's November races at Texas, a matter that Gossage said in 2014 was "a shot fired by Formula One at NASCAR." Gossage had also lowered the sanctioning fee for the IndyCar Series' race at Texas in order for the series to race at COTA.

In 2017, COTA president Bobby Epstein told the Austin American-Statesman he had been in contact with NASCAR officials and that "everyone seems to want to be here, so I see no reason why it couldn't come together." Gossage ridiculed the news, rebutting in the Fort Worth Star-Telegram that he "just laughed at it" as "anyone can talk to a NASCAR official."

Although NASCAR did not race at the track in the 2010s, demonstrations involving NASCAR drivers took place during the decade. In 2013, to promote the V8 Supercars' Austin 400 at the track, Kurt Busch participated in a seat swap with Supercar champion James Courtney, with Busch driving Courtney's Holden Racing Team Supercar and Courtney in Busch's Furniture Row Racing Chevrolet SS. Six years later, Tony Stewart drove a two-seat version of his Stewart-Haas Racing Ford Mustang around the circuit with Haas F1 Team drivers Romain Grosjean and Kevin Magnussen riding. Stewart compared COTA to NASCAR road course Watkins Glen International due to its "very, very technical" nature, and rebuked skepticism about stock car overtaking opportunities by noting there were "five and potentially six passing zones on that race track for Cup cars." Although he added excluding COTA as a potential NASCAR host track would be an "injustice", Stewart also argued the "worst thing [NASCAR] could ever do is take one of the races from Texas Motor Speedway."

On September 30, 2020, NASCAR revealed the 2021 Cup Series schedule with a COTA race planned for May 23. The Xfinity and Camping World Truck Series, along with the International Motor Sports Association's Lamborghini Super Trofeo North America sports car series, joined the weekend as support races; the Truck race was part of the Triple Truck Challenge. The race replaced the spring event at Texas, which became the NASCAR All-Star Race. Speedway Motorsports, which operates TMS, assumed organizational responsibilities of the COTA race while company liaison Bryan Hammond was named race executive director in November.

Although the shortened,  layout was considered, NASCAR announced on December 11 that the weekend's races would utilize the full, 3.426-mile course. To accommodate stock cars, safety changes to the track included placing tire barriers, extending the pit wall, adding caution lights, and installing curbs and rumble strips.

On February 25, 2021, Speedway Motorsports announced EchoPark Automotive would assume naming rights for the race, branding it the EchoPark Texas Grand Prix.

Chase Elliott won the inaugural EchoPark Texas Grand Prix. The race was shortened to 54 laps due to heavy rain. This would give Hendrick Motorsports their 268th win tying Petty Enterprises and Chevrolet their 800th victory in NASCAR.

Past winners

Notes
2021: Race shortened due to heavy rain.
2022: Race extended due to a NASCAR Overtime finish.

Manufacturer wins

References

External links
 
 

2021 establishments in Texas
Circuit of the Americas
NASCAR races at Circuit of the Americas
NASCAR Cup Series races
Annual sporting events in the United States